Bob Scanlon refers to:

Bob Scanlon (boxer) (1886–?), American boxer
Bob Scanlon (footballer) (born 1954), Scottish footballer